The 12th Bersaglieri Regiment is an inactive unit of the Italian Army last based in Trapani in Sicily. The regiment is part of the army's infantry corps' Bersaglieri speciality and was last operationally assigned to the Mechanized Brigade "Aosta".

History 
The Regiment was raised on 16 September 1884 in Verona with the existing XXI, XXIII and XXXVI battalions. The XXIII Battalion had distinguished itself during the Third Italian War of Independence at Castel di Borgo in Borgo Valsugana earning a Silver Medal of Military Valour, which the battalion transferred to the newly raised regiment. The regiment participated in the First Italo-Ethiopian War and the Italo-Turkish War.

World War I 
At the outbreak of World War I the regiment was garrisoned in Milan and sent to the front along the Isonzo, where the regiment earned its second Silver Medal of Military Valour and a Bronze Medal of Military Valour. On 31 January 1917 the regiment's depot in Milan raised the 18th Bersaglieri Regiment.

After the war the 12th Bersaglieri Regiment was disbanded, but it was raised again in 1923 with two cyclist battalions, which were exchanged on 11 March 1926 with the XXI and XXIII Bersaglieri battalions. At the outbreak of World War II the regiment consisted of the XXI Motorcyclists Battalion, the XXIII Auto-transported Battalion, the XXXVI Auto-transported Battalion.

World War II 

In spring 1941 the regiment participated in the Invasion of Yugoslavia. In early 1942 the regiment was sent to Libya to join the 133rd Armored Division "Littorio" for the Western Desert campaign. The regiment entered the line on 20 June 1942 at the end of the Battle of Gazala and was heavily engaged six days later at the Battle of Mersa Matruh. Reduced to a strength of 1,000 men the regiment fought in the Second Battle of El Alamein. Forced to retreat the remnants of the regiment reached Tripoli on 12 November 1942, where on 8 December 1942 the 12th Bersaglieri Regiment was disbanded and the survivors integrated in the 7th Bersaglieri Regiment.

Cold War 
On 24 May 1961 the XXIII Bersaglieri Battalion was raised again as mechanized infantry unit of the 182nd Armored Infantry Regiment "Garibaldi". On 1 March 1964 the 32nd Tank Regiment was raised again and the XXIII Bersaglieri Battalion became its mechanized infantry battalion.

23rd Bersaglieri Battalion "Castel di Borgo" 
During the 1975 Italian Army reform the 32nd Tank Regiment was disbanded on 1 October 1975 and the XXIII Bersaglieri Battalion was renamed 23rd Bersaglieri Battalion "Castel di Borgo" and received the flag and traditions of the 12th Bersaglieri Regiment. The battalion was based in Tauriano and part of the 32nd Armored Brigade "Mameli". Bersaglieri battalions created during the reform were named, with two exceptions, for battles in which Bersaglieri units had distinguished themselves: the 23rd Bersaglieri Battalion was named for its conduct at Castel di Borgo during the Third Italian War of Independence.

For its conduct and work after the 1976 Friuli earthquake the battalion was awarded a Silver Medal of Army Valour, which was affixed to the battalion's flag and added to the battalion's coat of arms.

Recent times 
After the end of the Cold War the Italian Army began to draw down its forces and the Mameli was the first brigade to be disbanded. On 1 April 1991 the brigade was officially deactivated and the 23rd Bersaglieri Battalion was transferred to the 132nd Armored Brigade "Ariete". On 31 March 1992 the Castel di Borgo was transferred to Trapani in Sicily, where the battalion joined the Mechanized Brigade "Aosta". On 2 September 1992 the battalion was renamed 12th Bersaglieri Regiment without changing size or composition. On 15 April 2005 the regiment was renamed 6th Bersaglieri Regiment and its battalion renamed 6th Bersaglieri Battalion "Palestro". Afterwards the flag of the 12th Bersaglieri Regiment was transferred to the Shrine of the Flags in the Vittoriano in Rome.

See also 
 Bersaglieri

External links
Italian Army Website: 12th Bersaglieri Regiment

References

Bersaglieri Regiments of Italy